A&E is an Australian subscription television channel which launched on Thursday 16 February 2012. A&E is a male-skewed channel that focuses on 'real life' content, similar to that of its American counterpart. On 23 February 2012, Austar announced on their Facebook page that they would be launching A&E on Sunday 26 February 2012.

A two-hour timeshift channel launched on 5 October 2016 on channel 614, replacing the now-defunct timeshift service for SoHo.

Programming

Original programming
Aussie Pickers (2013–2014)
Bogan Hunters (2014)
Demolition Man (2017–present)
Desert Collectors (2017–present)
Gus Worland: Marathon Man (2014)
MegaTruckers (2012)
Pawn Stars Australia (2015)
Road to Riches (2019)
Shearing Gang

Other programming
American Pickers
American Hoggers
Bad Ink
Baggage Battles
Barry'd Treasure
BBQ Pitmasters
Big Rig Bounty Hunters
Big Shrimpin'
Call of the Wildman
Chasing UFOs
Counting Cars
Destination Fear
Dipper's Backyard BBQ Wars
Duck Dynasty
Flipping Boston
Fool's Gold
Garage Gold
Gator Boys
Ghost Adventures
Ghost Adventures: Screaming Room
Hardcore Pawn
Hillbilly Blood
Horseplayers
The Dead Files
The Hunt
Ice Pilots
Ice Road Truckers
In Search of Aliens
Inked
The Liquidator
Lizard Lick Towing
Meet the Hockers
Operation Repo
Paranormal Lockdown 
Pawn Stars
Road Hauks
Rocky Mountain Bounty Hunters
Shipping Wars
Storage Wars
Storage Wars: Texas
Toy Hunter
Treasure King

References

2012 establishments in Australia
English-language television stations in Australia
Television networks in Australia
Television channels and stations established in 2012
A&E Networks
Foxtel